Secos & Molhados (English: Dry & Wet) is an innovative Brazilian band formed in 1971 and best known for their first two studio albums that helped launch singer Ney Matogrosso's career. The other two members were João Ricardo, founder and main songwriter of the group, and Gerson Conrad.

History
The first line-up, consisting of João Ricardo, Gérson Conrad and Ney Matogrosso, plus various musicians as John Flavin (guitar), Willy Verdaguer (electric guitar), Marcelo Frias (drums), Sergio Rosadas (flute), plus a special participation of Zé Rodrix was short-lived - only two albums were released, one in 1973 and one in 1974, both self-titled. This line-up achieved success, appearing in several television broadcasts and remains highly influential today. Matogrosso's unusual high-pitched voice helped create a distinct identity as well as the band's eccentric heavy make-up and outfits (developed by Matogrosso himself, with influences ranging from Brazilian indigenous peoples to kabuki theater). In typical Tropicália fashion, Secos & Molhados's style was one marked by a broad fusion of genres, including glam rock, MPB, fado and experimental music, among others. Most lyrics for both studio albums were adapted from the work of poets such as Manuel Bandeira and Vinicius de Moraes. In reference to their MPB musical style, “Another group that expressed its disagreement via the physicality of its performance style—and, inevitably, via rock music, was the Secos & Molhados. Mixing progressive rock and blues, incorporating Luso-Brazilian folk references (in “O vira” – [name of a Portuguese dance]) and by the constant inclusion of poetry—by names like Vinicius de Moraes, Manuel Bandeira and Fernando Pessoa, among others—the trio enjoyed a meteoric career, with two albums released between 1971 and 1974, and an enormous popular success driven by the visual appeal of their makeup and the sexually ambiguous theatricality of vocalist Ney Matogrosso. The Secos & Molhados appear at Maracanã stadium in 1974
Ronald Fonseca/ Agência O Globo. The black-and-white makeup that marked the signature look of the group was chosen almost by chance. Prior to the success of the Secos & Molhados, Ney Matogrosso had been an actor and, in a show by the group at the Casa da Badalação e Tédio, a club next to the Ruth Escobar Theatre, he arrived late, having come straight from a children's play in which he had been acting.  In his haste, he took the stage still in full makeup. João Ricardo, founder and lead composer of the band, and bandmate Gérson Conrad were excited by the audience reaction and decided to adopt that style. That artifice was amplified by Matogrosso's stage and television performances themselves. Early in the 1970s, he had demanded a newly hegemonic role. In the article Corpo e performance no experimentalismo do grupo Secos & Molhados (Body and performance in the experimentalism of the group the Secos & Molhados), Vargas describes the singer's posture with precision: “His figure is arrogant (bulging bare chest, head held high), even with bare feet. His eyes are wide open, the shrill voice is remarkable, the exaggerated movements of his mouth emphasize the pronunciation of the words, hip movements insinuate other codes, feathers, beads and sequins jangle with his body, a series of dance movements or completely free movements on the stage become codes for freedom. These weren’t rehearsed moves, that always stayed the same.” Instead of driving away the public in a country that was still conservative, the effect was the opposite: sold-out shows all over Brazil, a tour in Mexico, hundreds of thousands of albums sold. “The two LPs by the Secos & Molhados were perhaps the biggest phenomenon experienced by the Brazilian recording industry in that period,” Zan observes. “I think the experience of that group set new standards for the staging of songs at a time when television was coming into its own as the principal medium of mass communication in this country. At the same time, the performances anticipated the invention of the video clip, a new component of the language of popular music.”

From 1974 onwards, the group remained active, with only João Ricardo as the only steady member. They have released several albums through the years. Their most recent release is an autobiographic album called "Chato-boy", featuring founding member João Ricardo with the addition of a new member - guitarist Daniel Iasbeck.

Discography
 Secos & Molhados (1973)
 Secos & Molhados II (1974)
 Secos e Molhados III (1978)
 Secos e Molhados IV (1980)
 A Volta do Gato Preto (1988)
 Teatro? (1999)
 Memória Velha (2000)
 Ouvido Nu (2003)
 Puto (2007)
 Chato-Boy (2011)

References

External links
- Secos & Molhados Site Official (Portuguese)
- Secos & Molhados Official Channel
- Secos & Molhados (Portuguese)
- Secos e Molhados (Portuguese)
- Secos & Molhados Facebook Official (Portuguese)

Brazilian rock music groups
Musical groups established in 1971
Musical groups disestablished in 1999
Musical groups from São Paulo
1971 establishments in Brazil
1991 disestablishments in Brazil